The 1943 Arkansas A&M Boll Weevils football team represents Arkansas Agricultural and Mechanical College, later known as the University of Arkansas at Monticello, in the 1943 college football season.  The Boll Weevils were coached by Gene Augusterfer, compiled a 5–2–1 record, and outscored their opponents 198 to 70.

Schedule

References

Arkansas AandM
Arkansas–Monticello Boll Weevils football seasons
Arkansas AandM football